Monsignor Patrick Brennan (1901–1950), was an American born, Catholic missionary priest, killed by North Korean forces in 1950. 
Patrick Brennan, was born March 13, 1901, in Chicago, Illinois, to Irish parents. He was educated in St Rita's High School and Quigley's Prep Seminary before studying for the priesthood in Mundelein seminary and ordained a priest for the Archdiocese of Chicago in 1928, and served as a curate in Epiphany Church, St. Mary of the Lake, and St Anthonys Joliet.

He joined the Missionary Society of St. Columban (Columban Fathers) in 1936 and assigned to Korea in 1938.

Fr Brennan was interned by Japanese forces, following the attack on Pearl Harbor in 1941, and repatriated to the US. He served as an Army Chaplain in Europe during the war,  in Normandy, Ardennes and Germany for which he was decorated with the Soldier's Medal for bravery.
 
In 1947 he was appointed missionary director of the Society in Asia.

In 1948, Monsignor Brennan was appointed Prefect Apostolic of Kwangju, Korea, where he was taken prisoner and killed by North Korean forces, September 24, 1950, in Taejon prison, along with two other Columban missionaries Fr. Thomas Cusack and Fr. John (Jack) O'Brien. His body was never recovered.

References

1901 births
1950 deaths
20th-century executions by North Korea
University of Saint Mary of the Lake alumni
Missionary Society of St. Columban
American Roman Catholic clergy of Irish descent
20th-century American Roman Catholic priests
American people executed abroad
Roman Catholic bishops of Gwangju
Military personnel killed in the Korean War